Rail Rode is a 1927 silent short animated film released by Paramount featuring Krazy Kat.

Plot
Krazy Kat and his pal Ms. Kwakk Wakk are on vacation as they board a train at the station. But their pleasant ride is going to have some disruptions when their rival Ignatz (drawn here to resemble a naked Mickey Mouse) also goes on board. Moments after the train departed, Krazy and Kwakk Wakk are confronted by Ignatz. The cat and the rodent engage in a brawl while the mallard stands aside, serving as Krazy's backup. Krazy eventually wins the fight and kicks Ignatz off the train. Though removed from the ride, Ignatz still looks to get back at them as the rodent tampers a track switch, sending the train into another track.

Krazy and Kwakk Wakk are still on the train, enjoying their tour. Although the train is running on a different track, they give it no thought, assuming they're on the right path. But things begin to look grim for them when they see another train coming right at theirs. Without enough time to come up with a good solution, Krazy takes out a huge spring and heads to the front of their train. Miraculously, the crash is prevented as the trains are cushioned by the spring. The mayor and the crowd, who are present at the scene, are amazed by the deed as they applauded and give handshakes to Krazy.

See also
 Krazy Kat filmography

References

External links
 Rail Rode at the Big Cartoon Database

1927 short films
1927 animated films
American black-and-white films
American animated short films
American silent short films
Krazy Kat shorts
Rail transport films
1920s American animated films
Animated films about birds
Paramount Pictures short films
Animated films about cats
Animated films about mice